Bon Air is a station on the Overbrook branch of the Pittsburgh Regional Transit's light rail network. It is located in the Bon Air neighborhood of Pittsburgh.  Bon Air is a high-level handicap-accessible station that exits into Bon Air from a valley below Roseton Avenue. The station is designed as the primary transit access for residents of this small neighborhood of single-family homes where bus service is limited.

History
Bon Air was opened in 2004, one of eight new platform-equipped stations which replaced 33 streetcar-style stops along the Overbrook branch.

Bus connections
54D South Side-Bon Air, 51 Carrick.

References

Port Authority of Allegheny County stations
Blue Line (Pittsburgh)
Silver Line (Pittsburgh)